Martin Büchel (born 19 February 1987 in Ruggell) is a Liechtenstein footballer, who currently plays for FC Ruggell in Liechtenstein and formerly played for the Liechtenstein national football team.

Career
Büchel began his career in his hometown for FC Ruggell and signed after nine years in the youth side with his club for local rival FC Vaduz. His talents as a youngster earned him a transfer in 2006 to Swiss Super League side FC Zürich, who were then champions of Switzerland. On 12 January 2010 left Büchel his Swiss club FC Zürich and turned on loan back to his former club FC Vaduz. Following a loan spell at Deportivo de La Coruña in Spain, Büchel joined German side FC Unterföhring in 2012.

Büchel re-joined FC Zurich in 2018 as an osteopath while also continuing his playing career with their reserve side.

In July 2019, Büchel moved on to another Zürich side, FC Red Star.

International career
He was one of Liechtenstein's biggest young football talents and made his international debut at the age of 17.
He announced his retirement from international football on 4 November 2021, being effective after the last matches of that year.

International goals
Scores and results list Liechtenstein's goal tally first.

References

1987 births
Living people
Liechtenstein international footballers
FC Vaduz players
Liechtenstein expatriate footballers
Expatriate footballers in Switzerland
FC Zürich players
Deportivo Fabril players
Association football midfielders
Liechtenstein footballers
Liechtenstein expatriate sportspeople in Switzerland
FC Ruggell players
FC Unterföhring players